Concordia Lutheran College is an independent, co-educational, day and boarding school of the Lutheran Church of Australia, located in Toowoomba on the Darling Downs of Queensland, Australia.

Concordia Memorial College was renamed Concordia College and later renamed Concordia Lutheran College, after merging with Martin Luther Primary School and Concordia Primary School.

It is made up of Hume Street Campus (formerly Martin Luther Primary School), Warwick Street Campus (formerly Concordia Primary School) and Stephen Street Campus (formerly Redlands Campus). Stephen Street Campus is the site of the heritage listed Redlands building).

Concordia participates in Rotary International's Interact Club program, in which students raise money and volunteer for various programs and charities in the school, the wider community and internationally.

Concordia's students frequently participate in charity events such as The Cancer Council's Relay for life, World Vision's 40 Hour Famine as well as sponsoring a child, also through World Vision.

Curriculum 
Concordia's Students study a variety of subjects in a range of categories including: Arts, Sciences, sports, Numeracy, Literacy, Languages, Studies of Society and Environment, Religious Education, Business, Technology, Furnishing and Metalwork. TAFE, University Headstart and Work Experience Programs are also frequently undertaken.

Concordia offers a unique Independent Learning Centre, where students can opt to study a unit of their own choice (E.g. World War I, The Mona Lisa, fashion design) This has proven to be a highly successful program, with students choosing and learning from units that will benefit their chosen careers later in life.

In 2007, Concordia was ranked among the 20 best schools in Queensland, from year 12 Overall Position results.

Sport 
As with most Australian schools, Concordia Lutheran College uses a house system.  The three houses of the college are:
 Altus - Red
 Kessler - White
 Stedman - Yellow

General Sporting days were held on Wednesdays until 2019, however many students choose to participate in extracurricular sporting teams such as 'Wednesday Night Volleyball' and 'Friday Night Basketball'

Annually, Concordia holds an athletics carnival, usually in the third term. A swimming carnival is held in the first term along with cross-country events in the first or second term.
Concordia also competes in Regional and Inter-Lutheran sporting events in Athletics, Cross Country and swimming. These are generally held in Brisbane and are contended by many Lutheran schools from South East Queensland.
There are also two sport captains nominated each year. The two captains participate in and run many events throughout the year.

Principals / Head of College

See also 
 List of schools in Queensland

References

External links 
 Concordia Lutheran College

Private primary schools in Queensland
Private secondary schools in Queensland
Lutheran schools in Australia
Boarding schools in Queensland
Educational institutions established in 1964
Schools in Toowoomba
1964 establishments in Australia
High schools and secondary schools affiliated with the Lutheran Church
Elementary and primary schools affiliated with the Lutheran Church